James Edward Henry (born September 4, 1948) is an American diver.

Early life
Henry was born on September 4, 1948 in San Antonio, Texas but later moved to the Dallas area where he dove for Hillcrest High school.

At Indiana University 
Henry was a diver at Indiana University from 1967-1970. While at the university Henry was the top diver for the 67-68, 68-69, and 69–70 years. Henry won four Big 10 championships, five NCAA titles (in multiple events), and ten AAU indoor and outdoor championships. Henry studied dentistry and joined the Alpha Iota Chapter of Theta Chi Fraternity while at IU.

1968 Mexico City Olympics 
In the 1968 Olympics that were held in Mexico City Henry won the bronze metal in the three-meter spring board dive. Henry was in line for the gold with three dives left. Henry ended up losing the gold to fellow American Bernard Wrightson and Henry ended up with the bronze in the event.

Later life 
In 1969 Henry was ranked as the number one springboard diver in the world. Henry ended up finishing his dentistry degree and practices dentistry in the Colorado Springs area. Henry lives in Colorado Springs, Colorado with his wife sue. Henry and his wife have two children and five grandchildren. Henry is also in the Texas diving hall-of-fame.

References
 http://www.tsdhof.org/jim-henry/
 https://web.archive.org/web/20121105084555/http://www.sports-reference.com/olympics/athletes/he/jim-henry-2.html
 https://honorsandawards.iu.edu/search-awards/honoree.shtml?honoreeID=3620 

Notes

External links
 

1948 births
Living people
Divers at the 1968 Summer Olympics
Olympic bronze medalists for the United States in diving
Sportspeople from San Antonio
American male divers
Medalists at the 1968 Summer Olympics
20th-century American people